Väki is a supernatural power in Finnish mythology. It was believed by Baltic Fins that väki resided in natural sites, objects, and animals. Väki has been compared to mana. However, according to Laura Stark, väki is about an impersonal power rather than a universal force. Väki has also been compared to orenda.

Some folklorists have stated väki are in objects, especially ones connected to the world of the supernatural. The concept of väki was first documented in the 18th century by Christfrid Ganander in his book Mythologia Fennica.

According to K. Krohn, väki originated from animistic beliefs. There is a lack of information regarding how most kinds of väki were used by tietäjä.

Etymology 
In modern Finnish väki means a crowd of people or inhabitants of a home or location. The word could also be translated to mean folk or people. The word väki also met power. The term väki is also used for haltija.(For the context of this article it is going to talk about the supernatural powers.)

Types of väki 
 Kallion Väki: Väki of the cliffs, this väki was used in court cases. Considered to be the most difficult väki to control and only old men handled it.
 Kalman Väki: Kalman väki is the väki of death. It is believed that this väki is inside corpses, graveyards, and other things connected with burials. It is believed people can get infected by this väki if they eat soil that contains it, not performing rituals for the dead properly, or disrespecting the dead.
 Löylyn Väki: Väki of the sauna said to infect people with diseases.
 Maan Väki: This väki resided in the ground. It differs depending on the type of ground and was used for various reasons.
 Metsän Väki: This väki was for the forest or animals. It was believed väki from forests could invade the human body and cause disease.
 Tulen Väki: This väki resided in fire. It had the power to both infect and heal. It is also considered the most powerful väki.
 Veden Väki: Väki that resides in bodies of water like lakes, bonds, or wells.

See also 
 Haltija

References 

Finnish mythology
Animism